Sabotage and Celebration is an album by British-born, Brooklyn-based pianist and keyboardist John Escreet. It was released on 15 October 2013 on Whirlwind Recordings.

Track listing

 Axis of Hope
 He Who Dares
 Sabotage and Celebration
 The Decapitator
 Laura Angela
 Animal Style
 Beyond Your Wildest Dreams

Credits
 John Escreet – piano, Fender Rhodes
 David Binney – alto/sop. saxophones
 Chris Potter – tenor saxophone
 Matt Brewer – double bass
 Jim Black – drums
 Adam Rogers – guitar (tracks 5 & 7)
 Louis Cole and Genevieve Artadi, Nina Geiger – vocals (track 7)
 Fung Chern Hwei – violin
 Annette Homann – violin
 Hannah Levinson – viola
 Mariel Roberts – cello
 Garth Stevenson – double bass
 Shane Endsley – trumpet
 Josh Roseman – trombone
 All tracks composed, arranged & produced by John Escreet
 Engineer, mixing & mastering by Tyler McDiarmid
 Executive producer – Michael Janisch

References

2014 albums